The Spanish forts of the Philippines, or fuerzas, are strongholds constructed by Filipinos and Spaniards primarily for protection against local and foreign aggressors during the Spanish colonial period, and during the subsequent American and Japanese occupations. Many are badly damaged, either due to old age or past conflicts. Currently, there are initiatives for restorations of all forts, beginning when the Baluarte Luna of La Union and the Intramuros of Manila were restored in the 2010s. In 2013, a typhoon and earthquake hit Central Visayas and damaged numerous Spanish fortifications, leading to the largest restoration activity for fortifications in Philippine history.

List of forts

UNESCO World Heritage status

Tentative list 
On May 16, 2006, a collection of five well-preserved examples of Spanish Colonial architecture was added to the UNESCO World Heritage Tentative List in the Cultural category.

The collection titled "Spanish Colonial Fortifications of the Philippines" include the following buildings located throughout the country:
 Fuerza de Capul, Northern Samar
 Dauis Watchtower, Dauis, Bohol
 Punta Cruz Watchtower, Maribojoc, Bohol
 Fuerza de San Andres, Romblon, Romblon
 Fuerza de Sta. Isabel, Taytay, Palawan

In 2015, by recommendation of UNESCO, the fortifications were removed from the tentative list of the Philippines as they 'will have a hard time meeting the standards of the organization'. The old town of Capul (Northern Samar), old town of Romblon (Romblon province), and old town of Taytay (Palawan) were recommended as possible heritage sites in the future once the Philippines submits them in the tentative list, along with a complete dossier.

Future re-inclusion list 
Heritage groups have been advocating for the return of the fortifications in the tentative list, but with the inclusion of at least twenty-one more Spanish colonial fortifications throughout the country to maximize its potential to be included in the World Heritage List. Restoration activities on numerous fortifications throughout the country are currently ongoing in a bid to support the future nomination of the fortifications to UNESCO. However, some fortifications are within private lands, hindering cultural agencies of government from restoring those forts. The possible return of the fortifications in the tentative list is supported by both governments of the Philippines and Spain. Other properties being proposed to be included for the re-nomination are:
 Intramuros, Manila
 Cuartel de Santo Domingo, Santa Rosa, Laguna
 Fuerza de Cuyo, Cuyo, Palawan
 Fuerza de Cagayancillo, Cagayancillo, Palawan
 Real Fuerza de Nuestra Señora del Pilar de Zaragoza, Zamboanga City
 Fuerza de San Felipe, Cavite City
 Fuerza de San Pedro, Cebu
 Fuerte de la Concepcion y del Triunfo, Ozamiz, Misamis Occidental
 Fuerza de San Antonio Abad, Manila
 Fuerza de Pikit, Pikit, Cotabato
 Fuerza de Santiago, Romblon, Romblon
 Fuerza de Jolo, Jolo, Sulu
 Fuerza de Masbate, Masbate
 Fuerza de Bongabong, Bongabong, Oriental Mindoro
 Cotta de Dapitan, Dapitan, Zamboanga del Norte
 Fuerte de Alfonso XII, Tukuran, Zamboanga del Sur
 Fuerza de Bacolod, Bacolod, Lanao del Norte
 Guinsiliban Watchtower, Guinsiliban, Camiguin
 Laguindingan Watchtower, Laguindingan, Misamis Oriental
 Kutang San Diego, Gumaca, Quezon
 Baluarte Luna, Luna, La Union

See also
Architecture of the Philippines
 List of ruined churches in the Philippines
History of the Philippines (1565–1898)
Spanish–Moro conflict
Piracy in the Sulu and Celebes Seas
Military history of the Philippines
Fortification
 List of forts

References

Further reading

External links
 Spanish Colonial Fortifications of the Philippines - UNESCO World Heritage Centre Retrieved 2009-03-03.

 
Spanish colonial infrastructure in the Philippines